David Hall (born ) was a Canadian politician who was the first leader of the Prince Edward Island New Democratic Party in 1972. He previously ran as the party's candidate in Hillsborough in the 1968 federal election.

Under Hall's leadership, the party contested three provincial by-elections in 1972 — its first attempt at running for provincial seats since the Co-operative Commonwealth Federation last competed in 1951 — and received 5.2 per cent of the total vote. Soon afterward, however, Hall moved out of the province and resigned the leadership. He was succeeded as leader by Aquinas Ryan.

Electoral Record

References

Year of birth uncertain
Living people
New Democratic Party of Prince Edward Island leaders
Prince Edward Island candidates for Member of Parliament
New Democratic Party candidates for the Canadian House of Commons